Fulwar is a given name and a surname. Notable people with the name include:

Fulwar Craven, 4th Baron Craven (died 1764), English landowner and sportsman
Fulwar Skipwith, 2nd Baronet (1676–1728), English landowner, Member of Parliament for Coventry
Fulwar Skipwith (1765–1839), American diplomat and politician
Thomas Fulwar (died 1667), Irish Anglican priest

See also 
 Fuller (surname)